Kerala State Legal Services Authority is the statutory body that provides free legal aid to the people of the state of Kerala, India. It is one among the several state Legal Services Authorities in India which were constituted following the Legal Services Authorities Act of 1987.

References 

State agencies of Kerala
Legal organisations based in India
Organisations based in Kochi
Legal aid
1987 establishments in Kerala
Government agencies established in 1987